Oreolalax weigoldi, also known as Weigold's lazy toad or Weigold's toothed toad, is a species of amphibian in the family Megophryidae. It is endemic to Sichuan, China. It is only known from its type locality, Washan in southern Sichuan; there are, however, many places with this name in Sichuan. It might be the same species as Oreolalax major (Liu and Hu, 1960).

Description

References

weigoldi
Frogs of China
Endemic fauna of Sichuan
Amphibians described in 1924
Taxa named by Theodor Vogt
Taxonomy articles created by Polbot